Manuel Alex Parra (born October 30, 1982) is an American professional baseball player who is a free agent. He has played as a pitcher in Major League Baseball (MLB) for the Milwaukee Brewers and Cincinnati Reds.

Early life
Parra graduated from Casa Roble High School in Orangevale, California, in 2000. In addition to pitching in high school, he also played first base. He graduated from American River College in Sacramento, California, in 2002. He was selected as the National Junior College Player of the Year by Baseball America that season. In 14 games, he had a 7–2 win–loss record with a 2.02 earned run average (ERA).

Professional career

Milwaukee Brewers
Parra was drafted by the Milwaukee Brewers in the 26th round of the 2001 Major League Baseball draft. Shoulder problems resulted in a slower-than-expected advancement through the Brewers' minor league system for the draft-and-follow prospect. They had also hindered the left-hander's ability to pitch deep into games, having only gone over 100 innings pitched in his 2003 season at Class A Beloit. After beginning the 2006 season at Class A-Advanced Brevard County, he was promoted to Double-A Huntsville in August and selected to participate in that year's Arizona Fall League. Through 5 years of professional baseball, Parra had a career minor league record of 28–15 with a 3.22 ERA. He had pitched just two complete games during this period. At the time, Parra relied primarily on his four-seam fastball but also utilized a curveball and split-finger fastball.

Parra attended spring training with the Brewers in 2007 where he allowed no runs or hits while striking out 3 batters in  innings over 4 relief appearances. He was assigned to Double-A Huntsville to begin the 2007 season. After 13 starts, he had a win–loss record of 7–3 with a Southern League-leading 2.68 ERA. He was promoted to the Triple-A Nashville Sounds in mid-June to replace ace pitcher Yovani Gallardo who had been called up to Milwaukee. Parra made his first career Triple-A start on June 20—a 3–0 loss in which he allowed 2 runs on 7 hits and 4 walks while striking out 6 batters in 6 innings.

On June 25, 2007, Parra's second Triple-A start, he pitched a perfect game against the Round Rock Express. This was only the third nine-inning perfect game in Pacific Coast League history. In all, Parra stuck out 11 batters, achieving strikeouts in every inning except the eighth. Six ground outs and 10 fly outs accounted for Parra's other outs in the game. Seventy-seven of his 107 pitches were counted as strikes.

After just two more Triple-A starts, Parra made his major league debut on July 20 against the San Francisco Giants. Coming on in relief, he surrendered no runs over  innings and struck out 3 of the 4 batters he faced. Parra appeared in eight more games, including two starts, before breaking his left thumb during a bunt attempt in a game on August 30, which forced him to finish the season on the disabled list. Parra ended the campaign with an 0–1 record and a 3.76 ERA in 9 games with the Brewers.

He returned to the mound at the beginning of the 2008 season, in which he had a 10–8 record. Despite throwing 17 wild pitches in that season, tying for the major league lead, his split-finger fastball was the most effective among major league starting pitchers. He remained in Milwaukee's starting rotation through 2009.

Parra was moved to the bullpen in 2010. On June 6 of that year, Parra became the 52nd major league pitcher to strike out four batters in an inning, doing so against the St. Louis Cardinals. Problems with his back and the necessary surgical removal of a bone spur in his throwing elbow resulting in him missing the entire 2011 season. He continued in a relief role for the Brewers in 2012, but was non-tendered at the season's end and became a free agent.  After five years with Milwaukee, Parra held a 26–33 record with a 5.12 ERA in 74 starts and 98 relief appearances.

Cincinnati Reds
On February 1, 2013, the Cincinnati Reds signed Parra to a one-year contract. He pitched in the bullpen with the Reds as a middle reliever. On April 26, he was placed on the disabled list with a strained pectoral muscle, and missed almost a month. From June 11 to July 28, he had a 19-game, 15.1 inning scoreless streak. In a year where he filled in for the high expectations of Sean Marshall, he shined, going 2–3 with a 3.33 ERA and 16 holds, striking out 56 in 46 innings (57 games). He entered June with a 6.23 ERA, and starting on June 11 to the end of the season, he had a 1.78 ERA in 35.1 innings.

On November 27, 2013, Parra agreed to a two-year, $5.5 million contract with Cincinnati. In 150 relief appearances from 2013 to 2015, Parra accumulated a 3–8 record with a 3.91 ERA before reaching free agency after the 2015 season.

Chicago Cubs
In 2016, Parra signed a minor league contract with the Chicago Cubs that included incentives potentially bringing the total value of the deal to US$2.7 million if he made the 40-man roster. Despite a strong showing in spring training, he was released by the Cubs and resigned to a new minor league contract on the same day in late March. Ultimately, Parra missed the entire 2016 season following Tommy John surgery in early April. In 2017, he was signed to a minor league contract and pitched out of the bullpen on 11 occasions for Chicago's Triple-A Iowa Cubs. He was released on June 25 with an ERA of 14.09.

Bridgeport Bluefish
On July 31, 2017, Parra signed with the Bridgeport Bluefish of the independent Atlantic League where he played for the remainder of the season.

San Francisco Giants
Though Parra was selected by the Long Island Ducks in the Bridgeport Bluefish dispersal draft, he later signed a minor league deal with the San Francisco Giants in February 2018. He pitched for their Triple-A Sacramento River Cats that season and was granted free agency after its end.

Leones de Yucatán
On June 1, 2019, Parra signed with the Leones de Yucatán of the Mexican League. Parra did not play in a game in 2020 due to the cancellation of the Mexican League season because of the COVID-19 pandemic.

Mariachis de Guadalajara
On March 11, 2021, Parra was loaned to the Mariachis de Guadalajara of the Mexican League, a new expansion team. In 8 relief appearances, Parra posted a 3.18 ERA and 5 strikeouts over 5.2 innings pitched.

Leones de Yucatán (second stint)
On July 19, 2021, Parra was returned to the Leones de Yucatán of the Mexican League.

See also
 List of Major League Baseball single-inning strikeout leaders

References

External links

1982 births
Living people
Baseball players from California
Major League Baseball pitchers
Milwaukee Brewers players
Cincinnati Reds players
Arizona League Brewers players
Ogden Raptors players
Brevard County Manatees players
Beloit Snappers players
Bridgeport Bluefish players
High Desert Mavericks players
Huntsville Stars players
Scottsdale Scorpions players
Nashville Sounds players
Wisconsin Timber Rattlers players
Pensacola Blue Wahoos players
American River Beavers baseball players
American baseball players of Mexican descent
American expatriate baseball players in Mexico
People from Carmichael, California
Louisville Bats players
Iowa Cubs players
Sacramento River Cats players
Leones de Yucatán players